Nujum Pak Belalang (The Fortune-telling of Pak Belalang) is a 1959 Singaporean comedy film directed by and starring P. Ramlee. The film is styled as a fairytale and is loosely based on a Malay folk tale.

Plot

This films follows Pak Belalang, a lazy man who loathes hard work. He has a young son named Belalang, who is smarter and more hardworking than his father. During his way home from work one day, Belalang encounters two thieves, Badan and Nyawa, who were just on their way back from stealing two cows. Using his wits, he scares them away and takes the cows back with him. He tells his father about it who panics and tells him to return the cows to their rightful owners. Belalang retorts that without knowing who they were, they couldn't do the right thing even if they wanted to. He then suggests that he would go to the mayor's house to seek out the rightful owners who would presumably go to report the loss of their cows to the mayor. Belalang could then tell them to come and see Pak Belalang who could pretend to be psychic and tell them the cows' whereabouts. Pak Belalang agrees and all goes as planned with a reward in place for both of them.

And then the thieves strike again, this time at the royal palace. It was then announced that anyone who could retrieve the stolen items would be greatly rewarded by the king, Sultan Shahrul Nizam. The mayor then excitedly goes to the Belalang's house in the middle of the night to bring him to the palace so he could help retrieve the stolen items with his psychic powers, as he had previously done with the cows. Pak Belalang is caught off guard and fails to bluff his way out of it, angering the king who gives him 3 days to retrieve the stolen items or be sentenced to death for his deception. The mayor is seen as a conspirator and is also promptly arrested causing him to faint when hearing the news. Pak Belalang returns home in a hurry to pack his belongings and tells Belalang that he will hide it out for the next three days. Belalang informs him of a perfect hiding place of a cave at Bukit Tunggal (Sole Hill) and Pak Belalang then tells him to bring food to him whenever he can. When Pak Belalang arrives at the cave, he overhears some people talking and discovers the two thieves trying to divide the coins from a gold chest they had stolen from the palace. He pretends to be a hunched back wise old man (Penunggu Gua) and scares them away. Once they run away, he gleefully places all the coins back in the chest and chants how lucky he is at having found exactly the same thing which he had been ordered to do.

In the meantime, Belalang was on his way to bring his father the promised food when he is intercepted by officials from the palace who bring him back to the palace. He is then interrogated on the whereabouts of his father and he tries to manipulate the conversation, thus angering the king who threatens to behead him. Pak Belalang then appears and reveals his discovery of the stolen palatial chest of gold. But he tells them that to retrieve it, they have to crawl on all fours, which they reluctantly adhere to. When the chest of gold is indeed found by the king, he decides to appoint Pak Belalang as the 'National Healer'. During the official appointment ceremony, the princess, Puteri Sri Bujur Sirih, takes a liking to Pak Belalang and in his first official task, he is called upon when she has a fainting spell (pengakit angau). She had actually just wanted to meet him; pretended to faint to get Pak Belalang to see her and then persuades him to arrange so that they could meet in secret. After the king and queen are called back in, he goes on to prescribe 'midnight air' for her fainting spells. Bewildered, the king agrees to it anyway.

When the princess and Pak Belalang meet at midnight, they reveal their affections for each other and she declares to call him 'Kanda Satria' from then on. The next morning, he meets her again but this time in his official capacity as the 'National Healer'(ahli nujum) and prescribes water which he had blessed. As Sultan Shahrul Nizam revels in his newfound relief that his daughter is in good health again, he and his ministers are met with thunderous sounds. Just then, a palace messenger arrives to inform the king that a rival kingdom's fleet belonging to the King of Masai has been spotted approaching their shores. He tells them to cautiously receive them and to strike back if met with hostility. The King of Masai is welcomed and promptly goes to the palace to present himself to Sultan Shahrul Nizam. He reveals that instead of waging war, he instead wanted to seek peace by waging a war of wits with their two National Healers. Pak Belalang was to be presented with a set of questions by the National Healer of the Kingdom of Masai to which he must answer all correctly. If he does, the Kingdom of Masai loses the wager and it relinquishes its rights, title and land to the Kingdom of Beringin Rendang. If Pak Belalang fails to answer all of the questions correctly, the land of Beringin Rendang would be forfeited to the Kingdom of Masai. Pak Belalang puts on a brave front but then rushes home to flee the country persuading his son to seek out a boat  they could escape in. As he does, he inadvertently lands in a boat occupied by the Kingdom of Masai's king and accompanying officials. He quickly hides himself and listens on as The Masai National Healer was persuaded to tell the rest of the party the answers to his questions. He had, up until then, kept them all a secret to himself and once the Masai contingent had alighted the boat, he swam to shore to inform his father of his discovery.

After the three days are up, the royal parties meet again and Pak Belalang was able to answer all the questions correctly thanks to Belalang overhearing everything on the boat. The Kingdom of Masai's National Healer was so convinced that he would win that he collapsed after Pak Belalang answered the last question correctly. The King of Masai then asks for another chance stating that it could be that he had been deceived by his National Healer himself. Pak Belalang tries to refute the demand and reminds them that the original agreement consisted of only three questions but he is then ordered by Sultan Shahrul Nizam to do it. Pak Belalang panics and calls out for his son, Belalang, who had been the one who persuade him to take the challenge and go through with the wager. It turned out to be a lucky guess as the King of Masai was holding a locust (called Belalang in Malay). Pak Belalang, who had been afraid, quickly recovers his composure and joins in the joy of Sultan Shahrul Nizam as they celebrate their victory.

Badan and Nyawa, the two thieves who had stolen the cows and the palatial chest of gold, arrives at the palatial boat of the King of Masai. They demand an audience with the Sultan of Masai, claiming to be his brother in law. They then tell the King that they have a plan for him to regain his country back and ask him to follow them. Having nothing to lose, the Sultan complies and he and his officials are taken to the same cave Badan and Nyawa had used when they stole the palatial chest of gold. Badan and Nyawa cast a spell on the palace putting everyone into a deep sleep and they then abduct the princess and take her back to the cave. The Sultan of Masai had never known Sultan Shahrul Nizam to have such a beautiful daughter but is puzzled as to how her being there could help him get his kingdom back. Badan and Nyawa then told him that once her disappearance is discovered, her father will issue a decree promising a reward to anyone who could return the princess unharmed. The prime minister then persuades him to instead use the services of their National Healer, Pak Belalang. In the meantime, the Sultan of Masai tried to charm his way with the princess but to no avail. When called upon, Pak Belalang is threatened with death if he failed to use his powers to find the princess. By some miracle, when he blessed the water, it gave apparitions of the princess and all those connected with he disappearance including the King of Masai. Pak Belalang quickly made his way there and rescues the princess. Pak Belalang and the princess lock in an affectionate embrace but is interrupted by the king and queen. He puts all the perpetrators under arrest and orders the immediate wedding of Pak Belalang and the princess. As all are brought away, Belalang is seen entering the cave and when asked why he was there, he tells his father that he had asked for hi own room and never got one. Now that they are to be married, he would have no place to sleep. The movie then ends with the theme song.

Cast
 P. Ramlee as Pak Belalang
Bad Latiff as Belalang
 Hashimah Yon as Tuan Puteri Si Bujur Sirih
 Ahmad Nisfu as Sultan Shahrul Nizam, of Beringin Rendang 
 Aziz Sattar as Badan (literal translation: Body)
 S. Shamsuddin as Nyawa (literal translation: Soul)
 Sa'amah as the Queen
 Shariff Dol as the Sultan of Masai
 Kemat Bin Hassan as the Prime Minister of Beringin Rendang
 Udo Omar as the Fortune Teller of Masai
 M. Babjan as the Prime Minister of Masai
 Malik Sutan Muda as Penghulu Hujung Jambatan
 Ali Fiji as Jambul
 H. M. Busra as Buntal
 M. Zain as Kachong
 M. Rafee as Kadok
 Habsah Buang as Inang. Incidentally she is also the biological mother of Hashimah Yon.

External links
 Nujum Pak Belalang at FilemKita.com
 

1959 films
Malay-language films
Malaysian musical comedy films
1959 musical comedy films
Singaporean musical comedy films
Films directed by P. Ramlee
Malaysian black-and-white films
Singaporean black-and-white films
Films with screenplays by P. Ramlee
Films scored by P. Ramlee
Malay Film Productions films
Films shot in Singapore
Films set in Asia